Programmed may refer to:
 Programmed (Innerzone Orchestra album), 1999
 Programmed (Lethal album), 1990

See also 
 Program (disambiguation)